Carla Ann Hughes (born June 12, 1981) is a former middle school teacher and murderer from Jackson, Mississippi, who was convicted of two counts of capital murder for the November 29, 2006 slayings of her lover's pregnant fiancee, Avis Banks, and Banks's unborn child. She is serving two consecutive sentences of life without parole at the Central Mississippi Correctional Facility near Pearl, Mississippi.

Early life and education
Carla Hughes was born on June 12, 1981, and was adopted by her uncle Carl and aunt Lynda Hughes when she was six weeks old. She was raised in Greenville, Mississippi. As a child, she excelled in horseback riding, beauty pageants and was an honors student.

Hughes earned her Bachelor's degree from the University of Southern Mississippi in the early 2000s. She next earned her Master of Education degree from Belhaven College in Jackson, Mississippi. Hughes then began taking graduate coursework in education at Delta State University. At the time of her arrest, she was pursuing a doctorate in education.

In 2004, she gave birth to a son.

Hughes started out her teaching career at an elementary school but then took a job as a 7th grade language arts teacher at Chastain Middle School in Jackson, Mississippi. It was there where she met fellow schoolteacher and basketball coach Keyon Pittman, a graduate of Alcorn State University. The two began having an intimate relationship. At the same time, Pittman had a live-in fiancee, Avis Banks, who was pregnant.

Murder and Investigation
On the night of November 29, 2006, Avis Banks, a daycare worker, was found shot and stabbed to death in the garage of her Ridgeland, Mississippi home. Her body was discovered by her fiance Keyon Pittman, and it appeared as if the perpetrator had kicked in their back door. After discovering the body, Pittman called his co-worker Carla Hughes.

Hughes was later interrogated by police, where she initially denied her sexual relationship with Pittman and later denied having access to a gun. However, Hughes's cousin indicated to police, via an attorney, that he had lent a loaded .38 caliber 5-shot revolver to Hughes shortly before the murder, and that she had returned the gun empty. Hughes was originally charged with accessory to murder after the fact, but on December 8, 2006, the charges were upgraded to two counts of capital murder.

Trial
Carla Hughes' trial began in October 2009. Prosecutors believed that Hughes killed Avis Banks so she could be with Pittman. Pittman testified for the prosecution on October 6, 2009, stating to jurors how he found Avis Banks' body in their garage, and talked about his relationship with Hughes. In addition to Pittman's testimony, prosecutors were able to prove that Hughes' cousin's gun was the murder weapon and that Hughes’ shoes were used to kick in the door. Cell phone records also showed that Hughes was near Banks’ and Pittman's home at the time of the murder.

Hughes' attorneys called Pittman a "bona fide womanizer" who did not want to be married with a child. They claimed that he had worn Hughes' shoes during the murder, and he discounted testimony about how Hughes' cellphone records placed her at the crime scene, claiming that she had a friend in the area.

On October 12, 2009, Hughes decided not to testify in her own defense. The case was then handed over to the jury.

Verdict
After eight hours of deliberation, Hughes's jury announced they had reached a verdict on October 13, 2009. Hughes was found guilty on both counts of capital murder. Although Hughes could have faced the death penalty, she was instead sentenced to serve two consecutive life sentences without parole.

Aftermath
On August 30, 2010, a Madison County judge denied Carla Hughes' request for a new trial.

On June 21, 2012, the Mississippi Supreme Court affirmed the judgment of the Madison County Circuit Court. Six issues were raised on appeal, all of which were found to be without error.

Media 

The Carla Hughes case and the murder of Avis Banks have been explored and re-enacted on several true-crime television shows that include Criminals at Work, Dateline NBC, Snapped, Forensic Files, Stolen Voices, Buried Secrets, Scorned: Love Kills, Fatal Attraction, A Wedding and a Murder, American Monster: With Honors, Redrum (played by Melissa Joyner), and The Killer Truth (HBO).

References

1981 births
Living people
American people convicted of murder
American female murderers
American female criminals
People from Greenville, Mississippi
People from Jackson, Mississippi
Belhaven University alumni
Delta State University alumni
People from Ridgeland, Mississippi
American murderers of children
Criminals from Mississippi
Prisoners sentenced to life imprisonment by Mississippi
University of Southern Mississippi alumni
Alpha Kappa Alpha members
African-American educators
21st-century African-American people
21st-century African-American women
20th-century African-American people